is a Japanese manga series written and illustrated by Kazushi Hagiwara. It began its serialization in Shueisha's Weekly Shōnen Jump in 1988, and has continued irregularly in Ultra Jump since 2000, with its latest chapter released in 2010. As of 2012, 27 collected tankōbon volumes have been released. The manga was formerly licensed for English release in North America by Viz Media; only the first 19 volumes were released.

Hagiwara is an enthusiastic fan of heavy metal music and Dungeons & Dragons, using ideas from both of these in the Bastard!! story. Many characters and places in the story, for instance, are named after members of Hagiwara's favorite bands.

The manga was adapted into a six-episode original video animation (OVA) series by AIC, released from 1992 to 1993. The OVA was released in North America by Pioneer in 1998. An original net animation (ONA) adaptation of the same name, by Liden Films, premiered on Netflix worldwide in June 2022. A second season will premiere in 2023.

Bastard!! is one of Shueisha's best-selling manga series of all time, with over 30 million copies in circulation.

Overview
Four centuries ago, Earth suffered a cataclysm caused by the demon Anthrasax before she was slain by the Dragon Knight, plunging the world into a new dark age. In the present, the Kingdom of Metallicana is attacked by the Dark Rebel Army who seek to resurrect Anthrasax. This prompts the high priest to ask his daughter to awaken Dark Schneider, a dark wizard and founding leader of the Dark Rebel Army who reincarnated himself within the body of 14-year-old Lucien Renlen. In time, Dark’s allies learn of his true nature and ties to the calamity that befell the Old World.

Bastard!!s history is about sorcery, revenge, and other power struggles in a Dungeons & Dragons–like world. It is a dystopian world, where people need magic to survive against wild beasts, and evil monsters. There are four kingdoms, each one the protector of one of the four seals that keep the God of Destruction in stasis.

Characters
  / 
 
 Dark Schneider (noted to be named after Udo Dirkschneider) is the most powerful wizard, revealed to have been created during the final days of the Old World by the Ten Wise Men of Europa as the pilot of the "Dragon Knight", a  mecha created to destroy Anthrasax. Following the cataclysm, Dark spent the four centuries cheating death while seeking world dominion and amassing a large harem. Fifteen years prior to the storyline, Dark amassed the Dark Rebel Army from thousands of wizards and warriors, led by his Riders of Havoc, Arshes Nei, Gara and Kall-Su. Dark was defeated by Metallicanan prince Lars Ul Metallicana, reincarnating himself inside the body of Lucien Renren before his spirit is sealed within the newborn by Geo Soto Noto, causing Lucien to grow up into different person. When the reformed Dark Rebel Army commenced a campaign to resurrect Anthrasax, Dark's seal is broken as he becomes a reluctant ally of Metallicana while winning back his Riders of Havoc before resuming his ambition. While originally  requiring Yoko to kiss Lucien to manifest, Dark gradually gains the ability to freely take over his host.
 After losing his battle against Anthrasax, Dark is cast into the depths of the upper levels of Hell where he encounters the fallen angel Satan. Satan reveals to Dark that he is a reabsorbed fragment of his brother Lucifer, the first fallen angel and Lucien's true identity, who is destined to lead demons and mankind to war against Heaven. But Dark refuses to align himself with Hell and then is thrust into battle with the High Commander of Hell, Porno Diano. Four years later, he returns to Earth and fights alongside the Seraphim against the devil Konron (Conlon). His body is destroyed by Konron's Trelldor Spinning Fist attack, but his head survives.
 
 
 Yoko is a strong-willed and somewhat temperamental redhead, daughter of the Geo Soto Noto, a chaste virgin, self-appointed guardian and friend of Lucien. The primary love interest of Dark Schneider, she is the first to use the "virgin's kiss" to awaken Dark. Having undergone priestess training she does not show any magical talent until later in the manga (acting as the party's cleric) and never in the OVA. Despite this, she is the one person that DS fears and (mostly) respects.
 She disappeared during the four-year series break, apparently being killed during the fall of King Crimson. In the same time period, a woman with the same appearance and known as "Lilith" appeared alongside the Kings of Hell. She was found near the borders of the Lethe and seems to have some memories about DS.
 
 
 Gara is a master of Ninjutsu who became a member of the Dark Rebel Army's Divine Generals after impressing Dark in an assassination attempt. He commands a sword which can draw its life force directly from the swordsman, allowing almost unbeatable magic attacks. Unfortunately, the strongest attack is usually fatal to use. When Gara learned of Dark's resurrection, he abducted Yoko and forced Dark to confront him at his keep in a battles that caused them to each lose an arm. Though defeated, Dark wins back Gara's services after restoring his arm and keeping his men alive during the keep's destruction.
 
 
 A half human, half Dark Elf. Her name is a reference to Whitesnake. Kept as a slave by the Wood Elves, she is now raised by Dark as his adopted daughter and eventual lover, following her tribe abandoning her tribe. As one of the Dark Rebel Army's Divine generals and founding members, Nei is well aware of Dark's abilities and revived some ancient magic used by her followers. When Nei's loyalty to the Dark Rebel Army comes to question, she allowed herself to be cursed by Abigail with the spell Accused. When Nei confronts Dark, Lucien's spirit made Dark Schneider aware of what was driving his daughter to attack. DS was outraged and tore out his own heart to drive off the power of the Accused spell (later resurrecting himself). Arshes rejoins him at this point, and they destroy the advancing armies.
 
 
 Kall-Su was the second general of Dark Schneider; he commands the Ice-Falchion, a great sword, and is innately magically powerful. Kall-Su was born in a distant village, persecuted for his father being an Ice-Dragon in human form. It led to him killing his ashamed mother in self-defense and then destroying his village soon after. He was later found and adopted by Dark, treated as an indentured servant. He boasts extreme power and is capable of transforming into an Ice-Dragon at will. He destroys the entire city of Whiteos-Neiki with his spell, Vizkaya, which freezes everyone in the Kingdom into solid ice. He is the last general left standing when the series unexpectedly terminates, and wishes for the apocalypse. It is explained that he was told by Anthrax to despise Dark Schneider, thus erupting into a battle between the two.
 Kall, Nei and Gara figure out why "glowing beings of light" have started a war against them via ancient computers in an underground base. They discover that the Apocalypse is fast approaching and the beings of light are in fact angels sent from God to kill a third of mankind (those deemed sinful for worshiping false gods). One of the twelve elves of Europa (riding an abomination looking similar to a behemoth with human feet, and dozens of eyes) sees the three and is angered that they have discovered the reason behind the current events of the earth through his computer system. After calling forth many monsters, they do battle. Before the battle evens starts, however, they discover that their swords are going erupting with energy and seems to have lost their power.
 Four years after the battle on earth, Kall-Su is found to be blinded (apparently from the scars over his eyes and face). He says that his power has increased exponentially over the past four years, though he does not know why. It is eventually made clear to him through "The Mysterious Boy" that he is filled with the same power as Elijah and deemed worthy to be his successor. It is also said that he is the "true" king of Metallicana, and will eventually have to do battle with Dark Schneider alongside the "Mysterious Boy". Many people do not believe that he is Elijah's successor, namely the dwarf king Jeloy, who was armed with a mighty ax to repel this fact. He and his men, however, were stopped by Lars, thinking that he was truly Elijah's successor (as he is a well-known hero in the dwarven kingdom). He corrects their statement, saying indeed that Kall is Elijah's successor and was told to do the work of God.
 After leaving the dwarf kingdom, Kall-Su decides to go to the world of spirits to seek help and awakes a mighty giant from his frozen slumber. The giant curses him for violating "holy" land and says that he will have to die for his "sins". Kall claims that "death will not be enough to atone for my crimes in this world" and throws a ball of super-condensed water at the giant, throwing his Ice-Falchion at the ball to release a surge of water upon the giant, returning it back to captivity in a pillar of frozen ice. Nei approaches him and tells him that it's not like him to be so rash. The ground begins to rumble and a gigantic gateway appears before the two, Kall claims that he will journey to the realm of spirits to try to ask for help against the upcoming war on Earth. His name is a reference to Kal Swan of the bands Lion and Bad Moon Rising.
 
 
 Abigail is a mysterious member of the Dark Rebel Army's Divine generals who appears after Dark's demise fifteen years prior, originally a scientist during the final years of the Old World as a member of Ten Wise Men of Europa who studied spiritual matter and played a role in Anthrasax‘s creation. After the fall of the Old World, Abigail traveled the new world before joining the Dark Rebel Army to orchestrate his scheme to facilitate Anthrasax's resurrection after ending up in the latter's thrall. He curses Arshes with the Accused spell, which forces her to obey him or her body would be painfully distorted into an immortal toad. He succeeds in breaking the three seals of Anthrasax, personally invading Metallicana while using the three Demonic Treasures. Despite nearly killing Dark's group, Abigail is destroyed with his demise obliterating Metallicana Castle. In the "Requiem of Hell" arc, he is seen communing with Dark and his friends, the Samurai. Following the angel attack on earth, Abigail converts his spirit into the mainframe grid system of the flying arc King Crimson Glory. There are clues that Abigail may be the "false prophet", the servant of the Antichrist mentioned in The Bible. His name comes from King Diamond's classic album, Abigail.
 
 
 Lars Ul, whose name is a reference to Lars Ulrich of Metallica, is the prince of the kingdom Metallicana. He is said to be their greatest warrior, due to him having the ability to slay armies of thousands single-handedly. A portion of his power comes from the "blood of dragons" flowing through his veins, giving him the increased vigor, power and speed, as well as the ability to use the "Ki", or spiritual power of the dragon for his attacks. He wields the dragon sword "Heavy Metal", a translucent blade whose destructive can be further augmented by absorbing the "ki" of dragons.
 Fifteen years before the story starts, he fought Dark Schneider to a standstill as the latter has conquered most of the world at that point. This forced Lars to kill Dark by using the "Dragon Knight". But Lars is cursed since he used the Dragon Knight to kill Dark instead of its intended quarry, transforming him into a baby dragon with everyone assuming he died defeating Dark.
 In the form of a baby dragon, Lars sought to find a successor to the Dragon Knight before he was taken in by Gara as pet and then following Dark despite their history. Lars eventually regains his original form once Dragon Knight was destroyed by Anthrax, revealing the truth of his curse. During the angel attack, Lars fights on against the angels using the power of the dragon. He is the last to stand his ground (as the Sorcerer Shoguns and Samurai were slain), though he eventually is killed by the higher ranked angels.
 
 
 Named after the artist Jon Bon Jovi, Bon Jovina is the unfortunate Captain of the Guard of Metallicana. He is constantly being crushed by enemies, but appears to be quite durable, because he survives being smashed by a Hydra, pummeled by a Minotaur with a giant war hammer, flattened by two walls, and blasted through two walls by the Hurricane Sword. He greatly dislikes Dark but is very loyal to the princess.
 Currently, Bon Jovina is in the Halls of Gathering with the other races of half-humans around the world to decide what to do about the upcoming battle.
 
 
 Princess of Metallicana and Lars's sister, she is strong and determined, but only somewhat magically powerful. She has been taken in by Dark's charms, even going as far as admitting that she "loves" him.
 
 
 Yoko's powerful cleric father; he transformed and imprisoned Dark in the form of Lucien at the end of the Great War which occurred 15 years before the main storyline. His name appears to reference Jeff Scott Soto, former singer for Yngwie Malmsteen.
 
 
 A war orphan who was raised by and learned High Ancient Magic from Arshes Nei, employing talismans to aid her and becoming one of the three Sorcerer Generals under Arshes' command. After Dark's resurrection was confirmed, Sean Ari was ordered to assassinate him. She attempts to kill Dark by posing as a lord's daughter while using her wiles and virginity, only for the lecherous sorcerer to see through her deception and seduce her into siding with him. Her name references Diamond Head vocalist Sean Harris.
 
 
 A wizard-warrior, the second Sorcerer General, she is a master of the ancient Hariken style of swordsmanship and forgotten magic, and her magical skill is greater than Sean's. Dark encountered her in a town where the citizens had been turned to stone, at first mistaking her for a boy with a crush on Ari Sean, and proceeded to taunt Kai with misinformation about Sean's virginity. Using a spell that turned humans into statues, the enraged Kai gained the upper hand in their fight and would have killed Dark, had Ari Sean not interfered and stalled her long enough for Dark to find Yng Wie, the source god of Kai's magic and overpower it with the power of his patron god, Black More. On the verge of defeat, Kai summoned a cockatrice to petrify both Dark and Ari Sean, only to have victory snatched away as she was injured by the cockatrice when she lost the means to control it. Dark helped "care for" her wound against her will, seducing and winning her in the process. Her name references Kai Hansen, former singer of Helloween and leader of Gamma Ray.
 
 
 The third Sorcerer General, a vain wizard who turned himself into a vampire before joining the Dark Rebel Army, able to resurrect himself as a bat before recreating his human body. He sought the power to overthrow Arshes Nei and Kall-Su by drinking the blood of many virgins, encountering Yoko's group when a werewolf in his service is killed by Dark Schneider as Lucien and learning enough of Dark's seal to quickly capture him, Yoko and Larz. Ari Sean and Kai Harn allowed themselves to be captured to save Dark, only for Di-Amon to bite Kai and injure Yoko when she comes to Sean's aid. This provokes Dark to forcefully manifest without a virgin's kiss, proceeding to defeat Di-Amon by exposing him to sunlight and inflicting his bat form with the Accused curse to force him into his service. He is modeled after metal legend King Diamond, even showing, in the OVA, a love of music, singing and face paint.
 
 
 Known as the God of Destruction, Anthrasax was created from an angel by scientists, magicians and alchemists to put an end to all conflict. But Athrasax acted on her own will and deemed humanity unfit to exist as she carried out a planet-wide genocide before she is defeated by the Dragon Knight in the battle that reshaped the world, buried under what became the Judas kingdom. The Dark Rebel Army, under Abigail's influence strive to revive Anthrasax by breaking the four seals that held her in place. But she eventually breaks free and sends Dark to Hell.

Media

Manga
Bastard!! is written and illustrated by Kazushi Hagiwara. The series began serialization in Shueisha's shōnen manga magazine Weekly Shōnen Jump on March 14, 1988, and ran on a regular basis in the magazine until August 21, 1989. The first tankōbon volume was published on August 10, 1988. The series was then switched to the Weekly Shōnen Jump Specials quarterly magazine, where it ran on an irregular basis. It was later published again in Weekly Shōnen Jump, on an irregular "monthly" basis, from 1997 to 2000. The series was transferred to the seinen manga magazine Ultra Jump, starting on December 19, 2000. The manga is published in the magazine on an irregular schedule. Its latest chapter was published on May 19, 2010. Twenty-seven volumes have been released as of March 2012. Shueisha re-released the series in a new kanzenban-like edition, titled Bastard!! Complete Edition, which updates Hagiwara's art style, improving his backgrounds, screentone and includes redrawing of some characters. Volumes were released from December 2000 to December 2009. In 2014, Shueisha released a nine-volume bunkoban edition from May to September.

In North America, Viz Media announced the license of Bastard!! in July 2001. The Viz edition is based on Bastard!! Complete Edition. Viz edition differs in a few ways from Japan release. Including graphic sexual scenes being censored, the major differences are the changing of place names. The series names places, spells and some people after various heavy metal bands, such as Metallica, Judas Priest, Whitesnake, Anthrax, Megadeth, Venom, Guns N' Roses, and Helloween. Fearing lawsuits, Viz Media (and Pioneer for the OVA adaptation) took the Japanese transliterations of these band names and changed them somewhat, then transliterating them back to English, e.g., Anthrax became "Anslasax", Iron Maiden into "Aian Meide", and the main city in which the story takes place, Metallicana, was changed to "Meta-Rikana". Viz Media published the first five volumes in a left-to-right edition from August 2002 to December 2003. The volumes were later republished in its original right-to-left version starting from November 2003. The manga stopped its publication after the release of volume 19 in September 2009.

Volume list

Original video animation
A six-episode original video animation (OVA) series by AIC was released between August 25, 1992 and June 25, 1993. The OVA cover the story up through the Four Lords of Havoc's battle against Abigail (volumes 6–7 of the manga).

In North America, Pioneer Entertainment released the series on three VHS set tapes with an English dub between August 28 and December 8, 1998. Pioneer re-released the OVA on DVD on June 5, 2001.

Original net animation
An original net animation (ONA) adaptation by Liden Films was announced on February 3, 2022. The 24-episode ONA is directed by Takaharu Ozaki, with scripts written by Yōsuke Kuroda, character designs by Sayaka Ono, and music composed by Yasuharu Takanashi. The first 13 episodes were released worldwide on Netflix on June 30, 2022, while the remaining 11 episodes were released on September 15 of the same year. The opening theme is "Bloody Power Fame" by Coldrain, while the ending theme is "Blessless" by Tielle. In Japan, the ONA series began a televised broadcast on BS11 on January 11, 2023.

A second season was announced in January 2023. It will premiere on Netflix in 2023.

Video games
A 1994 Bastard!! 3D fighting game was released for Super Famicom. A role-playing video game with turn-based fighting elements, titled , was released for PlayStation on December 27, 1996.

A MMOG platformer called Bastard!! Online was also in development by the Japanese publisher Tecmo and software developer Shaft. A beta test was released in 2006; however, Tecmo announced that they had canceled its development in December 2009.

Reception and legacy
Bastard!! is one of Shueisha's best-selling manga series of all time, with over 30 million copies in circulation.

Video game designer and producer Daisuke Ishiwatari said Bastard!!s fantasy setting was a major influence on creating Guilty Gear.

Notes

References

Further reading

External links
Bastard!! at Viz Media
Bastard!! official ONA website 
Kazushi Hagiwara's official website 

Hagipageshop

1988 manga
1992 anime OVAs
2022 anime ONAs
Anime International Company
Anime series based on manga
Dark fantasy anime and manga
Geneon USA
Japanese-language Netflix original programming
Liden Films
Netflix original anime
NBCUniversal Entertainment Japan
Post-apocalyptic anime and manga
Seinen manga
Shōnen manga
Shueisha franchises
Shueisha manga
Sword and sorcery anime and manga
Viz Media manga